Secret Door  is a 2014 South Korean television series starring Han Suk-kyu, Lee Je-hoon, Kim Yoo-jung, Park Eun-bin, Kim Min-jong, and Choi Won-young. It aired on SBS on Mondays and Tuesdays at 22:00 from 22 September to 9 December 2014 for 24 episodes.

Plot
The period drama explores the conflicted and ultimately tragic relationship between King Yeongjo and his son, Yi Sun (Crown Prince Sado). Shrewd Yeongjo wants to strengthen royal power, but passionate and idealistic son dreams of equality and a status-free society.

Cast

Han Suk-kyu as King Yeongjo
Lee Je-hoon as Lee Sun, later Crown Prince Sado
Kim Yoo-jung as Seo Ji-dam (episodes 1-13)
Yoon So-hee as adult Ji-dam / Park Bingae (episodes 14-24)
Park Eun-bin as Lady Hyegyeong
Kim Min-jong as Na Chul-joo
Choi Won-young as Chae Je-gong
Kim Chang-wan as Kim Taek
Jang In-sub as Jang Dong-gi	
Lee Won-jong as Park Mun-su
Kang Seo-joon as Min Woo-sub
Seo Jun-young as Shin Heung-bok
Choi Jae-hwan as Heo Jung-woon
Kim Myung-gook as Hong Bong-han
Jang Hyun-sung as Hong Gye-hui
Kim Ha-kyun as Kim Sang-ro
Um Hyo-sup as Min Baek-sang
Jung Moon-sung as Byun Jong-in
Jeon Gook-hwan as Lee Jong-sung
Kim Seung-wook as Jo Jae-ho
Baek Seung-hyeon as Shin Chi-woon
Ha Seung-ri as Queen Jeongsun
Lee Seol as Moon Suk-ui, Yeongjo's concubine
Son Byong-ho as Kim Sung-ik
Park Hyun-sook as Court lady Choi
Kim Kang-hyun as Eunuch Jang
Kim Mi-ran as Court lady Kim
Kim Tae-hoon as Kang Pil-jae
Lee Won-jae as Kang Seo-won
Choi Won-hong as Uhm Jae-sun
Park Hyo-joo as Woon-shim
Kim Bo-ryung as Choon-wol
Jung Wook as Heuk-pyo
Yoon Choong as Jang Sam
Ji Sang-hyuk as Lee Sa
Park So-eun as Shin Go-eun
Kwon Hae-hyo as Seo Gyun
Jung Gyu-soo as Yang Soon-man
Lee Mi-young  as Court lady Min
Kim Young-sun as Heung-bok's mother
Kim Han-joon as Constable Choi
Kim Hyun as Painter Jang
Yoon Seo-hyun as Chun Seung-se
Kwak Hee-sung as Kim Moo
Go On as Lee Gyo
Lee Won-keun as Kim Moon

Historical background
Secret Door is a revisionist take on the last eight years of Crown Prince Sado's life.

According to historical documents, primarily those written by his wife in the Memoirs of Lady Hyegyeong, Sado was insane and violent, and was a serial rapist and killer. He was deemed unfit to rule, but court rules forbade Yeongjo from directly killing royalty. So Yeongjo issued a royal decree that ordered Sado to climb into and be sealed within a large wooden rice chest on a hot July day in 1762. After eight days, Sado died of suffocation and starvation at age 27. In the 19th century, conspiracy theories arose that Sado had not been mentally ill, but had pushed for revolutionary changes and thus his political opponents had framed him for crimes he did not commit. The circumstances surrounding his death continue to be an issue of debate among Korean historians.

Upon his ascension to the throne, Sado's son King Jeongjo memorialized and honored his father's tomb, and Sado and Hyegyeong were posthumously elevated in status and given the titles Emperor Yangjo and Empress Heonyeong.

Awards and nominations

References

External links
Secret Door official SBS website 

2014 South Korean television series debuts
2014 South Korean television series endings
Seoul Broadcasting System television dramas
South Korean historical television series